The Latvian Museum of Decorative Arts and Design is an arts museum in Riga, Latvia. The museum was established on 1 January 1989 and opened to the public on 6 July 1989. It is located in the former church St. George's Church, Riga, the oldest surviving stone building in Riga.

The opening and closing plenary of the Northern Future Forum gathering of UK, Nordic, Baltic prime ministers was held here in 2013.

References

External links
 Official site
 Museum of Decorative Arts and Design at Google Cultural Institute

Museums in Riga
Art museums and galleries in Latvia
Decorative arts museums
Art museums established in 1989
1989 establishments in Latvia